Hiroaki Saiuchi (Japanese 歳内 宏明; born 7 July 1993) is a Japanese professional baseball player who currently plays for the Tokyo Yakult Swallows of Nippon Professional Baseball.

References

1993 births
Living people
Japanese baseball players
Nippon Professional Baseball pitchers
Hanshin Tigers players
Tokyo Yakult Swallows players
Sportspeople from Amagasaki
Baseball people from Hyōgo Prefecture